Fundi can refer to:

People
 Fundi (Billy) Abernathy (1939–2016), American photographer
 Fundi Konde (1924–2000), Kenyan musician and singer
 Fundi Tshazibana (born c. 1977), South African economist and Deputy Governor of the South African Reserve Bank

Other uses
 Fundi (politics), a faction of the Green Party, notably in Germany
 Fondi (Latin name Fundi), a Roman town in Italy
 Fundi, a local African name for the cereal crop Digitaria exilis
 Fundi: The Story of Ella Baker, a 1981 documentary
 Fundi, a member of the Kasakela chimpanzee community in Gombe National Park, Tanzania

See also

 Fundy (disambiguation)
 Fundie, pejorative slang for religious fundamentalists
 Fundus (disambiguation), plural form fundi